Douglas Dewayne Moseley, known as Doug Moseley (March 24, 1928November 8, 2017), was a Kentucky minister and politician who served in the Kentucky Senate from 1974 to 1986.

Moseley died on November 8, 2017 at Hospice House in Southern Kentucky.

References

1928 births
2017 deaths
Republican Party Kentucky state senators
Politicians from Bowling Green, Kentucky
People from Campbellsville, Kentucky
American non-fiction writers
Western Kentucky University alumni
Kentucky Wesleyan College alumni
Emory University alumni
Candler School of Theology alumni
People from Russell County, Kentucky
Writers from Bowling Green, Kentucky
American United Methodist clergy